Sinforiano García (born August 22, 1924) is a Paraguayan retired professional football (soccer) goalkeeper, who played for two top level Paraguayan clubs and for Brazilian club Flamengo.

Career
Born in Puerto Pinasco, Paraguay, Sinforiano García started his career in 1944, playing for Atlético Corrales, moving in 1945 to Cerro Porteño, leaving this club in 1948. He joined Brazilian club Flamengo in 1949, after scouts observed him during the 1949 South American Championship, and played his first game for the club on May 29, 1949, when his club defeated Arsenal of England 3–1 at Estádio São Januário, Rio de Janeiro. Sinforiano García played 276 games and suffered 364 goals defending the Brazilian club, and was crucial for the club's 1953, 1954 and 1955 Campeonato Carioca titles.

International career
He played 20 games for the Paraguay national team between 1945 and 1949.

References

1924 births
Possibly living people
Paraguayan footballers
Paraguayan expatriate footballers
Paraguay international footballers
Cerro Porteño players
CR Flamengo footballers
Association football goalkeepers
Expatriate footballers in Brazil
Paraguayan expatriate sportspeople in Brazil